Cadillac Records is a 2008 American biographical drama film written and directed by Darnell Martin. The film explores the musical era from the early 1940s to the late 1960s, chronicling the life of the influential Chicago-based record-company executive Leonard Chess, and a few of the musicians who recorded for Chess Records.

The film stars Adrien Brody as Leonard Chess, Cedric the Entertainer as Willie Dixon, Mos Def as Chuck Berry, Columbus Short as Little Walter, Jeffrey Wright as Muddy Waters, Eamonn Walker as Howlin' Wolf, and Beyoncé Knowles as Etta James. The film was released in North America on December 5, 2008, by TriStar Pictures. The soundtrack was released on Music World/Columbia and Sony Music.

Plot
In 1947 in Chicago, a Jewish immigrant from Poland and bar owner Leonard Chess (Adrien Brody) hires a blues combo, including guitarist Muddy Waters (Jeffrey Wright) and harmonica player Little Walter (Columbus Short). Waters' and Walter's success leads to Chess opening the doors for black musicians and beginning a new record label in 1950 – Chess Records. This attracts stars like Etta James (Beyoncé Knowles), Howlin' Wolf (Eamonn Walker) and Chuck Berry (Mos Def). Inevitably, business and personal lines blur as the sometimes-turbulent lives of the musicians play out.

Cast

Background
Leonard Chess was the co-founder of the 1950s American record label Chess Records, located in Chicago, Illinois. He ran the legendary company with his brother, Phil, through the 1950s and '60s. The label started selling records from the back of Chess' Cadillac, and launched the careers of legendary musical personalities such as blues singers and harmonica and guitar players Little Walter and Muddy Waters, Howlin' Wolf, soul legend Etta James and guitarist singer-songwriters Chuck Berry and Willie Dixon.

Production

The screenplay was written by director Darnell Martin. The filming of Cadillac Records started in February 2008. Filming locations included Louisiana, Mississippi, and New Jersey. Martin directed the film, financed by Sony BMG Film. Cadillac Records was produced by Andrew Lack and Sofia Sondervan, and co-executive produced by Beyoncé Knowles.

Casting
Originally, Matt Dillon was slated to play the role of Chess, but the role was ultimately given to Adrien Brody due to scheduling conflicts with Dillon.<ref>{{Cite magazine|url=https://www.ew.com/ew/article/0,,20172936,00.html|title=Adrien Brody, Jeffrey Wright in Cadillac'|date=January 22, 2008|magazine=Entertainment Weekly|access-date=2008-03-28}}</ref> Early announcements of the cast also included Columbus Short as Little Walter, Golden Globe winner Jeffrey Wright as Muddy Waters,  and multi-Grammy Award winner Beyoncé as Etta James. According to director Martin,  the role of James was written with Beyoncé in mind.

As production increased, the roster grew to include Canadian actress Emmanuelle Chriqui as Revetta Chess, Tammy Blanchard as Isabelle Allen, English actor Eamonn Walker as Howlin' Wolf, and comedian Cedric the Entertainer as Willie Dixon. Final line ups of the cast also grew to include rapper Mos Def as Chuck Berry, and Gabrielle Union in the role of Geneva Wade, Muddy Waters' common law wife.

Music

The American multi-instrumentalist, songwriter, and record producer Steve Jordan produced the soundtrack to the film. He also picked a group of blues musicians, including Billy Flynn (guitar), Larry Taylor (bass), Eddie Taylor Jr. (guitar), Barrelhouse Chuck (piano), Kim Wilson (harmonica), Danny Kortchmar (guitar), Hubert Sumlin (guitar), and Bill Sims (guitar) who, along with Jordan on drums, recorded all of the blues songs used in the film.

Beyoncé recorded five songs for the soundtrack, including a cover version of Etta James' "At Last" which was released on December 2, 2008 as its lead single. Mos Def, Jeffrey Wright, Columbus Short, and Eamonn Walker recorded songs for the soundtrack, and Raphael Saadiq, Beyoncé's sister Solange, Mary Mary, Nas, Buddy Guy, and Elvis Presley also appear on the album. The soundtrack was released in single and double-disc editions.

The month after the film was released, Beyoncé performed "At Last" at the inauguration ball of Barack Obama, as he and wife Michelle danced together for the first time as President and First Lady.

The soundtrack spent 48 weeks at number one of the Top Blues Albums.

The soundtrack was nominated for three 2010 Grammy Awards in the following categories: Best Compilation Soundtrack Album for Motion Picture, Television or Other Visual Media, Beyoncé's "Once in a Lifetime" for Best Song Written for Motion Picture, Television or Other Visual Media and Beyoncé's "At Last" for Best Traditional R&B Vocal Performance.

Release and reception
The film had its world premiere on November 24, 2008, at the Egyptian Theatre in Los Angeles. On December 5, 2008, it entered general release in the United States. On its opening weekend, the film opened at Number 9, grossing $3.4 million in 686 cinemas with an $5,023 average. When the film left cinemas in January 2009, it had yet to recoup its $12 million budget; it ended its run with a worldwide box office gross of  $8,880,045.

Critical reception
Rotten Tomatoes reports that 66% of 124 critics gave the film a positive review, with an average rating of 6.1/10. The website's critics consensus reads: "What Cadillac Records may lack in originality, it more than makes up for in strong performances and soul-stirring music." Another review aggregator, Metacritic, gave the film a weighted average score of 65 out of 100, based on 30 critics, indicating "generally favorable reviews".

Roger Ebert of the Chicago Sun Times gave the film three stars and stated in his review that "The film is a fascinating record of the evolution of a black musical style, and the tangled motives of the white men who had an instinct for it." Elizabeth Weitzman of the Daily News awarded the film three stars and wrote in her review, "Writer-director Darnell Martin clearly respects the fact that the history of Chess Records is a worthy subject." Most critics praised the film for its music, but complained about its script. Jim Harrington of the San Jose Mercury News praised Beyoncé's vocal performance and wrote in his review that, "Beyoncé Knowles' captivating voice and the film's other pluses can't outweigh the glaring omissions from the story line for this critic" and "Chess Records deserves, and will hopefully someday get, a better spin than the one delivered by Cadillac Records."

Recognition and accolades
David Edelstein of New York magazine named it the 4th best film of 2008,
Stephanie Zacharek of Salon named it the 4th best film of 2008, and
A. O. Scott of The New York Times named it the 10th best film of 2008. During the 2009 award season, Knowles received a Satellite Award nomination for her portrayal of Etta James. Knowles, Amanda Ghost, Scott McFarmon, Ian Dench, James Dring and Jody Street received a Golden Globe nomination, Best Original Song, for writing "Once in a Lifetime"; a song Knowles recorded for the film's soundtrack. The film also garnered seven NAACP Image Award nominations, which included Outstanding Motion Picture, Outstanding Actor in a Motion Picture (Jeffrey Wright), Outstanding Supporting Actor in a Motion Picture (Cedric the Entertainer, Columbus Short and Mos Def), and Outstanding Supporting Actress in a Motion Picture (Beyoncé Knowles).

Home media
The film was released on DVD and Blu-ray on March 10, 2009, and sold over 130,000 copies in its first week. To date it has made an estimate of $11,916,737 in sales, which coupled with its box office gross helped the film pay back its $12 million budget (total gross: $20,796,782).

Awards and nominations

See also

 List of American films of 2008
 Cadillac Records: Music from the Motion Picture''

References

External links
 
 
 
 
 

2008 films
Blues films
2008 biographical drama films
2000s musical drama films
Films set in the 1950s
Films set in 1951
Films set in 1956
African-American musical drama films
Biographical films about musicians
American biographical films
American rock music films
Films directed by Darnell Martin
Films shot in Mississippi
Films shot in Louisiana
Films shot in Newark, New Jersey
Films about race and ethnicity
TriStar Pictures films
Films scored by Terence Blanchard
African-American biographical dramas
Cultural depictions of blues musicians
Cultural depictions of soul musicians
Cultural depictions of rock musicians
Cultural depictions of folk musicians
Cultural depictions of the Rolling Stones
Films set in Chicago
2008 drama films
2000s English-language films
2000s American films